Just Like You is the second studio album by American singer Keyshia Cole. It was released by Geffen Records on September 24, 2007. Cole started work on the project shortly after the release of her debut album, The Way It Is (2005). She consulted a variety of producers and songwriters to work with her on the album, including Missy Elliott, Bryan-Michael Cox, Scott Storch, Rodney Jerkins, The Runners, J. Wells, Pete Rock, and Soulshock. Guest vocalists include Elliott, Lil' Kim, Too $hort, Amina Harris, Anthony Hamilton, Young Dro, T.I., ***** Santana, and Piper.

Upon release, Just Like You received mixed to positive reviews from music critics who considered it one of the better R&B albums of the year, but were critical with the abundance of ballads within the track listing. She was also dubbed by some critics as the "princess of hip-hop soul". It was nominated for Best Contemporary R&B Album at the 50th Annual Grammy Awards that was held February 2008, but lost to Ne-Yo's Because of You (2007). As of December 2007, the album has been certified platinum in sales by the Recording Industry Association of America (RIAA) and remains Cole's highest-selling album to date with 1.7 million copies sold.

Conception
Cole started work on her second album shortly after the release of her debut album, The Way It Is. About the album, Cole says, "This album is more about you, inside, and how you need to get yourself together, rather than pointing at somebody else and saying, 'You don't treat me right, you don't do this.' I'm truly lovin it, I listen to it myself. The last album, I didn't really listen to until I went on tour. [Because] when you listen to your own experience, it's like, I don't wanna hear it anymore. I do write from my personal experiences, but I think it's very important to young women."

Promotion
The first single off the album is "Let It Go", an upbeat club track that features Missy Elliott and Lil' Kim. The video premiered on BET's Access Granted on July 11, 2007. The second single is the Darkchild-produced "Shoulda Let You Go". The album was promoted with the second season of her reality show, Keyshia Cole: The Way It Is, which premiered on October 30, 2007. "Give Me More" came in at No.1 on The Editor's List inside Cove Magazine October 2007 Issue for the top 5 Soul/R&B recordings for the month of September 2007. The album's title track was the theme for Cole's BET reality series during seasons 2 and 3.

On November 27, 2008, the album was released in Australia, titled Just Like You (International Deluxe Version). This release is a hybrid of Just Like You and The Way It Is and also features Keyshia's collaborations with Diddy and Sean Paul. It contains 16 songs and has a different cover to the original version of the album. On May 9, 2008, the international album had been released in Germany, Austria, and Switzerland as well.

Tour 
Following the album's release, Cole went on a promotional tour for the album.

Critical reception

Just Like You received mixed to positive reviews from music critics. At Metacritic, which assigns a normalized rating out of 100 to reviews from mainstream critics, the album has an average score of 72 based on 11 reviews, indicating "generally favorable reviews." Album of the Year collected 3 reviews and calculated an average of 67 out of 100.

Allmusic editor Andy Kellman found that "in some ways, Just Like You plays out like an album that could've only been made after Mary J. Blige's Breakthrough, [...] balancing desperation with conviction and mixing lush arrangements with penetrative melodies [...] Despite all this weirdness, this stands as a very good album by Keyshia Cole, also the point where Cole's voice grows from an occasionally powerful emotive device into a versatile instrument."  Similarly, Thomas Inskeep from Stylus noted that while the "album isn’t perfect," it proves "that Cole’s capable of some seriously rich, powerful art." He added: "Cole’s still finding her way, but on Just Like You it sounds as if she’s already named and claimed her voice [...] Just Like You is tough and tender like Blige’s sophomore album My Life, and while it may not quite match its predecessor’s legendary status, it’s not so far off—and it sounds like the R&B; album of the year, easily."

Christian Hoard from Rolling Stone called the "album a work of engaging, pop-wise R&B;: The beats stick mostly to jumpy keyboard bounce with string stabs and other minor adornments [...] The ballads are rarely more than snoozy; Cole is at her best when she gives love a kick in the pants [...] Cole is not Mary J. Blige yet, but she certainly sounds older than her years." In her review for The Boston Globe, Joan Anderman wrote that the "songstress could have used a good editor on her second album, which is bogged down by too many ballads and overly lush production. But even though Just Like You doesn't match the raw, anthemic power of her 2005 debut, The Way It Is, Cole's a singer to be reckoned with, particularly in an urban market saturated with imitators." Entertainment Weeklys Neil Drumming felt that "Cole still traffics in heartache. But whereas The Way It Is relied on raw hip-hop beats, Just Like You drips with treacly strings and piano. This counterintuitive lushness smothers Cole’s modest wail on cuts like ”Heaven Sent.” The album's best tracks are its barest."

Commercial performance 
One week after its release, Just Like You debuted at number two on the US Billboard 200 behind Rascal Flatts's Still Feels Good (2007) and at the top of Billboards official Top R&B/Hip-Hop Albums chart, with first week sales of 281,419 copies, more than quadruple the first week of her first album The Way It Is (2005) and to Cole's best week first weeks sales as of 2018. By December 2007, the album had shipped 1,000,000 copies in the United States and was certified platinum by the Recording Industry Association of America (RIAA). Just Like You went on to finish 87th on the Billboard 200 and 19th on Billboards 2007 Top R&B/Hip-Hop Albums year-end chart. As of 2010, the album has sold 1,700,000 copies in the United States.

Track listing
Credits adapted from the liner notes of Just Like You.

Notes and sample credits
 denotes co-producer
 denotes vocals producer
 denotes additional producer
 denotes uncredited producer
"Let It Go" samples "Juicy Fruit" performed by Mtume.
"Got to Get My Heart Back" contains excerpts from "She's Only a Woman" performed by The O'Jays. 
"Losing You" contains excerpts from "Sorry" performed by Natalie Cole.

Charts

Weekly charts

Year-end charts

Certifications

Release history

References

External links
Just Like You at Metacritic

2007 albums
Albums produced by Bryan-Michael Cox
Albums produced by Rodney Jerkins
Albums produced by Ron Fair
Albums produced by the Runners
Albums produced by Pete Rock
Albums produced by Missy Elliott
Albums produced by Sean Combs
Albums produced by Scott Storch
Geffen Records albums
Keyshia Cole albums